The 1951 Butler Bulldogs football team was an American football team that represented Butler University as a member of the Indiana Collegiate Conference (ICC) during the 1951 college football season. Led by 14th-year head coach Tony Hinkle, the Bulldogs compiled an overall record of 4–4–1 with a mark of 3–2 in conference play, placing third in the ICC.

Schedule

References

Butler
Butler Bulldogs football seasons
Butler Bulldogs football